Yoshikazu Minami may refer to:

 Yoshikazu Minami (photographer) (born 1935), Japanese photographer
 Yoshikazu Minami (shogi) (born 1963), Japanese shōgi player